John Sherman "Johnny" Rutherford III (born March 12, 1938), also known as "Lone Star JR", is an American former automobile racing driver. During an Indy Car career that spanned more than three decades, he scored 27 wins and 23 pole positions in 314 starts. He became one of ten drivers to win the Indianapolis 500 at least three times, winning in 1974, 1976, and 1980. He also won the CART championship in 1980. 

Rutherford began racing modified stock cars in 1959 and he also dabbled in stock car racing, making 35 NASCAR Cup Series starts from 1963 to 1988. Rutherford won in his first start, at Daytona International Speedway driving for Smokey Yunick. This made him one of the youngest drivers ever to win in NASCAR history, in a full points-paying NASCAR race.

Racing career
In 1959, Rutherford started driving modified stock cars in Dallas. He joined the International Motor Contest Association sprint car circuit in 1961 leading it for most of 1962.  Rutherford later joined the United States Auto Club (USAC) starting in the Hoosier Hundred and later winning his first championship.

Rutherford won his qualifying heat race for the 1963 Daytona 500, becoming the youngest winner of a Duel as a championship race, a record that would stand as the races were taken off the championship schedule in 1971 (though it has since been broken, the race was not a championship race when it happened). Later that year he also had his first start in the Indianapolis 500. Rutherford's first Indy car race win took place at the Atlanta 250.  He won the USAC National Sprint Car Championship in 1965.

Rutherford made his first start in the Indianapolis 500 in 1963. The following year he was directly behind Eddie Sachs when Sachs plowed into the burning car of Dave MacDonald, killing both drivers. Rutherford miraculously squeezed between the crash and the wall, passing so close to Sachs' car that a lemon that Sachs wore on a string around his neck was found inside Rutherford's engine compartment.

On April 3, 1966, Rutherford suffered a serious crash at Eldora Speedway. His car flipped out of the track, and he suffered broken arms, a broken finger, and a head injury. He was forced to sit out the 1966 Indy 500 and the rest of the season. He struggled without a competitive ride for the next several seasons. He raised his profile by qualifying a surprising 2nd for the 1970 500 and leading early on. He was back with a top-flight ride when he joined the McLaren team in 1973.

Rutherford won pole position at the Indy 500 in 1973, 1976, and 1980. In 1973, Rutherford set a one-lap track record of 199.071 mph, falling just shy of becoming the first driver to break the 200 mph barrier at Indianapolis. His long-awaited second career win came at the Ontario Motor Speedway in 1973, and victories at the Indy 500 followed in 1974, 1976 and 1980. In 1984, at Michigan International Speedway, Rutherford set an all time Indy car qualifying lap speed record of 215.189 mph. His win in  the 1986 Michigan 500 at age 48 made him the oldest winner of a 500-mile race, a record that still stands, and also made him the first driver to win a 500-mile race at four different tracks (Ontario, Indianapolis, Pocono, Michigan). From 1973 to 1981 Rutherford recorded nine straight seasons with a victory making him one of just six drivers in Indy Car history to do so.

In October 1977, Rutherford travelled 'down under' to compete in Australia's most famous motor race, the Bathurst 1000 km (600 mi) touring car race at the Mount Panorama Circuit. There, partnering fellow Indianapolis racer Janet Guthrie (who earlier that year had become the first woman to qualify for the Indianapolis 500), Rutherford drove a V8 powered Holden Torana for the team that had won the 1976 race, Ron Hodgson Motors. Driving a completely unfamiliar car (Australian cars have the steering wheel on the right side of the car) on a 6.172 km (3.835 mi) public road course carved into the side of a mountain, Rutherford qualified 26th out of 60 starters. During practice he complained about his car as it was not as good as the teams lead car driven by 1976 winners Bob Morris and John Fitzpatrick (JR was 8.2 seconds slower). Morris then got in the car and while not as quick as his own Torana, easily lapped over 5 seconds faster showing the problem was simply JR's lack of familiarity with the car and track. Wisely, JR made a cautious start to the race (another new experience was the standing start), but his race would come effectively to an end on lap 8 when he attempted to lap the Ford Escort RS2000 of 1966 winner Bob Holden. The Torana and Escort made contact and Rutherford ended up crashing into an earth bank at the top of The Mountain. The bent Torana was then brought back to the pits on the back of a tilt-tray truck (with the race still going at full speed and cars passing the truck going along the 2 km long Conrod Straight at over ). It was then disqualified before being reinstated. Rutherford then completed another 5 laps before finally retiring with Guthrie not getting to drive.

Rutherford's NASCAR Winston Cup career included 35 starts from 1963 to 1988. He won in his first start, at Daytona International Speedway driving for Smokey Yunick. The win, in the second 100-mile Daytona 500 qualifying race, made him one of the youngest drivers ever to win in NASCAR history, in a full points-paying NASCAR race. (Until 1971, the qualifying races were full points-paying races.) In 1981, Rutherford drove twelve races, the most he ever raced in a single NASCAR season. In addition, Rutherford competed in five runnings of the International Race of Champions – 1975, 1977, 1978, 1980 and 1984.

Post-racing career
Rutherford's 24th and final start at the Indianapolis 500 would come in 1988. By that time he was running only a part-time schedule, and was splitting time working as a television analyst on NBC, CBS, and ESPN. Starting in 1989, Rutherford also began serving as the driver analyst on the IMS Radio Network, a position he would hold in most years through 2002.

When not racing or working in broadcasting, Rutherford served as the pace car driver for the CART series. He also served as a driver coach, evaluating rookies during rookie orientation and rookie tests. He failed to qualify at Indy in three attempts (1989, 1990, 1992) and was not able to secure a ride in 1991 or 1993. During the month of May 1994, Rutherford officially retired from racing. He was never able to achieve his milestone 25th Indy 500 start.

At the inception of the Indy Racing League in 1996, Rutherford took a full-time position as an official, serving as pace car driver (until 2016) and driver coach. Rutherford also served as a racing consultant for Team Pennzoil.

Personal life 
Although "Lone Star JR" proudly displayed the flag of Texas on his racing helmet, Rutherford was actually born in Coffeyville, Kansas and moved to Texas at a young age.

Johnny met Betty Hoyer, a nurse, at the Indianapolis Motor Speedway in 1963 when he was taking his rookie test. They married two months later and were a highly visible and inseparable couple throughout Johnny's racing career. His first Indy 500 win in 1974, with Betty looking on from the pits, helped to end the superstition in American racing against allowing women in the pit area.

Rutherford was the honorary chairman of the Amelia Island Concours d'Elegance in 2006.

Rutherford, who has been invited to The White House on behalf of Indy on multiple occasions, is considered a popular ambassador and spokesman for the sport of Indy car racing.

Awards
 Inducted into the International Motorsports Hall of Fame in 1996
 Inducted in the National Sprint Car Hall of Fame in 1995
 Inducted in the Motorsports Hall of Fame of America in 1996 
 Inducted in the Indianapolis Motor Speedway Hall of Fame in 1987

Motorsports career results

NASCAR
(key) (Bold – Pole position awarded by qualifying time. Italics – Pole position earned by points standings or practice time. * – Most laps led.)

Grand National Series

Winston Cup Series

Daytona 500

International Race of Champions
(key) (Bold – Pole position. * – Most laps led.)

American open–wheel racing results
(key)

Complete USAC Championship Car results

PPG Indycar Series
(key) (Races in bold indicate pole position)

Indy 500 results

References

External links 

Rutherford's career NASCAR, IROC, and Indy Car Stats
Rutherford at Champ Car Stats
Rutherford  at The Greatest 33

1938 births
Living people
Champ Car champions
Champ Car drivers
Indianapolis 500 drivers
Indianapolis 500 polesitters
Indianapolis 500 winners
International Motorsports Hall of Fame inductees
International Race of Champions drivers
NASCAR drivers
National Sprint Car Hall of Fame inductees
People from Coffeyville, Kansas
People from Fort Worth, Texas
Racing drivers from Kansas
Racing drivers from Dallas
Racing drivers from Texas
Team Penske drivers
USAC Silver Crown Series drivers
Walker Racing drivers
A. J. Foyt Enterprises drivers
McLaren Racing drivers